Muslim Armenians may refer to:

 Hidden Armenians, Christian Armenians of Turkey who became Islamized, and Turkified or Kurdified to escape the Armenian genocide
Hemshin peoples, an ethnic group of Armenian origin, and who were originally Christianbut were Islamized during the Ottoman Empire